William Jennings Bryan Herman (July 7, 1909 – September 5, 1992) was an American second baseman and manager in Major League Baseball (MLB) during the 1930s and 1940s. Known for his stellar defense and consistent batting, Herman still holds many National League (NL) defensive records for second basemen and was inducted into the National Baseball Hall of Fame in 1975.

Biography

Early life
Born in New Albany, Indiana, in 1909, and named after William Jennings Bryan, the three-time Presidential candidate and statesman of the turn of the 20th century, Herman attended New Albany High School.

Baseball career
His first at-bat was memorable. Facing Cincinnati Reds pitcher Si Johnson, Herman chopped a pitch into the back of home plate, which then bounced up and hit Herman in the back of the head, knocking him out. A fixture in the Chicago lineup over the next decade, Herman was a consistent hitter and solid producer.

At 37, he was considered prime managerial material by the new owners of the Pittsburgh Pirates. On September 30, 1946, Herman was traded to Pittsburgh with three marginal players (outfielder Stan Wentzel, pitcher Elmer Singleton and infielder Whitey Wietelmann) for third baseman Bob Elliott and catcher Hank Camelli. Herman was promptly named playing manager of the 1947 Pirates, but he was aghast at the cost—Elliott—the Pirates had paid for him. "Why, they've gone and traded the whole team on me", he said. Elliott won the  NL Most Valuable Player award and led Boston to the 1948 National League pennant. Herman's 1947 Pirates lost 92 games and finished tied for seventh in the NL, and he resigned before the season's final game. (His last appearance as a Major League player was on August 1 of that year.)

Herman then managed in the minor leagues and became a Major League coach with the Dodgers (1952–57) and Braves (now based in Milwaukee) (1958–59)—serving on five National League pennant winners in eight seasons. After his firing by the Red Sox in September 1966, he coached for the California Angels (1967) and San Diego Padres (1978–79) and served in player development roles with the Padres and Oakland Athletics.

Herman finished his 1,922-game big-league career with a .304 batting average, 1,163 runs scored, 2,345 hits, 486 doubles, 82 triples, 47 home runs, 839 runs batted in, 737 bases on balls and 428 strikeouts. Defensively, he recorded an overall .968 fielding percentage. He won four NL pennants (and ) but no World Series championships as a player (although he was a coach on the 1955 World Series champion Brooklyn Dodgers). His record as a Major League manager was 189-274 (.408). Herman holds the NL records for most putouts in a season by a second baseman and led the league in putouts seven times. He also shares the Major League record for most hits on opening day, with five, set April 14, 1936.

Later life

Herman moved to Palm Beach Gardens, Florida in 1968. He died of cancer in 1992.

In 2013, the Bob Feller Act of Valor Award honored Herman as one of 37 Baseball Hall of Fame members for his service in the United States Navy during World War II.

Personal
Herman's granddaughter is Cheri Daniels, wife of former Indiana Governor Mitch Daniels.

Managerial record

See also

 List of Major League Baseball career hits leaders
 List of Major League Baseball doubles records
 List of Major League Baseball career doubles leaders
 List of Major League Baseball career runs scored leaders
 List of Major League Baseball annual doubles leaders
 List of Major League Baseball annual triples leaders
List of Major League Baseball player-managers

References

Further reading
 Honig, Donald (1975) Baseball When the Grass Was Real: Baseball from the Twenties to the Forties Told by the Men Who Played It. New York: Coward, McGann & Geoghegan. pp. 134–163. .

External links

Billy Herman Oral History Interview (1 of 3) - National Baseball Hall of Fame Digital Collection
Billy Herman Oral History Interview (2 of 3) - National Baseball Hall of Fame Digital Collection
Billy Herman Oral History Interview (3 of 3) - National Baseball Hall of Fame Digital Collection

1909 births
1992 deaths
Baseball players from Indiana
Boston Braves players
Boston Red Sox coaches
Boston Red Sox managers
Brooklyn Dodgers coaches
Brooklyn Dodgers players
California Angels coaches
Chicago Cubs players
Dayton Aviators players
Deaths from cancer in Florida
Louisville Colonels (minor league) players
Major League Baseball player-managers
Major League Baseball second basemen
Major League Baseball third base coaches
Milwaukee Braves coaches
Minneapolis Millers (baseball) managers
Minneapolis Millers (baseball) players
Minor league baseball managers
National Baseball Hall of Fame inductees
National League All-Stars
New Albany High School (Indiana) alumni
Oakland Athletics scouts
Oakland Oaks (baseball) players
People from New Albany, Indiana
Pittsburgh Pirates managers
Pittsburgh Pirates players
San Diego Padres coaches
San Diego Padres scouts
Vicksburg Hill Billies players
American military personnel of World War II